The Ohio Senate is the upper house of the Ohio General Assembly. The State Senate, which meets in the Ohio Statehouse in Columbus, first convened in 1803. Senators are elected for four year terms, staggered every two years such that half of the seats are contested at each election. Even numbered seats and odd numbered seats are contested in separate election years. The president of the Ohio Senate presides over the body when in session, and is currently Matt Huffman.

Currently, the Senate consists of 26 Republicans and 7 Democrats, with the Republicans controlling three more seats than the 22 required for a supermajority vote. Senators are limited to two consecutive terms. Each senator represents approximately 349,000 Ohioans, and each Senate district encompasses three corresponding Ohio House of Representatives districts.

Composition 
135th General Assembly (2022-2023)

Leadership

Other Officers

Clerk: According to the Rules of the Senate, the clerk is elected by the members of the Senate and is tasked with maintaining records of all Senate bills and resolutions. The clerk is also responsible for handling all documents received from other government departments.

Members of the 135th Senate

Past composition of the Senate

References

External links
Ohio Senate official website
Project Vote Smart – State Senate of Ohio
Map of Ohio Senate Districts, 2012-2022
2012 Election Results from Ohio Secretary of State
2010 Election Results from Ohio Secretary of State
2008 Election Results from Ohio Secretary of State
2006 Election Results from Ohio Secretary of State

Ohio General Assembly
State upper houses in the United States